Ralph Tailboys, Lord of Middleham was an Anglo-Breton knight from Yorkshire. He was a son of Ribald de Bretagne, himself the bastard son of Odo, Count of Penthièvre, and Beatrice de Taillebois.

When Ribald became a monk, following the death of his wife, his lands were passed to Ralph.

Ralph was a tenant of count Stephen. He married Agatha, daughter of William de Brus, Lord of Annandale and Christina. He is known to have had two sons, Ribald and Robert.

Notes

References

Year of birth unknown
Year of death unknown
12th-century English people
People from Middleham